The 10K run is a long-distance road running competition over a distance of . Also referred to as the 10K road race, 10 km, or simply 10K, it is one of the most common types of road running event, alongside the shorter 5K and longer half marathon and marathon. It is usually distinguished from the 10,000 metres track running event by stating the distance in kilometres, rather than metres.

As one of the shortest common road distances, many 10K races attract high levels of public participation. Among the largest 10K races, the Peachtree Road Race in Atlanta, United States had over 55,000 participants in 2011 while the Vancouver Sun Run and Bolder Boulder both had close to 50,000 runners. The popularity of 10K races lies in the fact that, for most adults, the 10K distance is long enough to represent a challenge but short enough to remain accessible for an untrained runner.

Most popular 10K races are an annual fixture in a city or area and typically incorporate an element of charity running, where participants raise funds for a cause, based upon their completion of the course. Members of the public may take part in the races as a competition or simply for pleasure as a fun run. Some races also allow wheelchair racers to enter. Traditional New Year's Day races are often held over 10K, including the San Silvestre Vallecana in Spain.

The accessibility of the distance, and road running in general, has meant that local governments and health charities often form partnerships with races as a way of promoting physical fitness among the general public. Medical organisations, fitness groups, drinks manufacturers and sportswear companies are typical commercial sponsors of 10K events.

The 10-kilometre metric distance has been used for road running events for a large portion of the modern era of athletics – the Běchovice–Prague race is one of the longest-running events over the distance, having first been held in 1897. In Western countries using imperial measurements, the 6-mile run (9.7 km) was once more prevalent, but many long-running events (such as the Cincinnati Thanksgiving Day Race and Saltwell Road Race) have adapted their courses to match the metric distance.

Professional 10K running
At the professional level, there are many races which offer significant prize money to athletes who achieve a high finishing position in the race. At the highest level, annual prize money can total over US$100,000 at races such as the World's Best 10K, Peachtree Road Race, Apryle Showers Run - Florida's Fastest 10K and World 10K Bangalore.

The 10K road distance has never featured on the event programmes of the Athletics at the Summer Olympics or the IAAF World Championships in Athletics. However, it did briefly have its own individual championship for women in the form of the IAAF World Women's Road Race Championships, which was contested over ten kilometres in 1983 and 1984. As a result, the highest level 10K road competitions occur at individual races run by race promoters, who attract elite international level runners through prize money and appearance fees. These types of races are held in all parts of the world, but the highest calibre races are mainly concentrated in the United States, Canada, Europe and East Asia.

The world records for the 10K road distance are 26:24 minutes for men (Rhonex Kipruto, 2020) and 29:43 minutes for women (Joyciline Jepkosgei, 2017). Performances over ten kilometres on the roads were not recognised as world records by the International Association of Athletics Federations (IAAF) until 2003 and instead the fastest times were referred to as "world bests". This changed in August 2003 when the IAAF Congress approved world record status for a number of specified road distances, including the 10 km.

As with other forms of professional long-distance running, East African athletes have been dominant in the 10K distance since the 1990s. As of January 2020, all ten of the fastest male 10K runners are East African (five of them Kenyan), while nine of the top ten female runners are Kenyan.

Area records
World records are in bold. Correct as of June 2018.

All-time top 25

Men
Correct as of January 2023

Notes
Below is a list of other times equal or superior to 27:09:
Rhonex Kipruto also ran 26:43 (2021), 26:46 (2018), 26:58 (2022).
Tadese Worku also ran 26:59 (2022).
Joshua Cheptegei also ran 26:49 (2022).
Kibiwott Kandie also ran 26:51 (2022).
Rodrigue Kwizera also ran 27:04 (2023).
Micah Kipkemboi Kogo also ran 27:07 (2007).
Rhonex Kipruto also ran 27:08 (2018).

Other bests en route or on aided road course equal or superior to 27:09
Correct as of February 2022.
+ = en route to longer performance
a = aided road course according to IAAF rule 260.28

Notes
Below is a list of other times equal or superior to 27:09:
Jacob Kiplimo also ran 26:56 (2022), 27:05 (2021).
Joshua Cheptegei also ran 27:09 (2022) .

Women
Correct as of January 2023.

Mx = mixed gender race
Wo = women only race

Notes
Below is a list of other times equal or superior to 30:24:
Yalemzerf Yehualaw also ran 29:19  (2023).
Sheila Chepkirui also ran 29:57  (2019), 30:07  (2022), 30:17  (2021).
Norah Jeruto also ran 30:07 (2019), 30:08 (2021).
Agnes Tirop also ran 30:20 (2021).
Fancy Chemutai also ran 30:22 (2018), 30:23 (2017).
Violah Jepchumba also ran 30:24 (2016).

Other bests en route or on aided road course equal or superior to 30:24
Correct as of May 2021.
+ = en route to longer performance
a = aided road course according to IAAF rule 260.28

Notes
Below is a list of other times equal or superior to 30:24:
Letesenbet Gidey also ran 29:44 (2019), 29:45 (2021).
Yalemzerf Yehualaw also ran 29:52  (2022), 30:22  (2021).
Joyciline Jepkosgei also ran 30:04 (2017), 30:07 (2017).
Fancy Chemutai also ran 30:07 (2017).
Brigid Kosgei also ran 30:18 (2020) and 30:21 (2021 ).
Hellen Obiri also ran 30:21 (2021 ).
Joan Chelimo also ran 30:21 (2021 ).

References

External links 

 IAAF list of 10k records in XML

Road running distances
Long-distance running distances